Jacek Popek (born 20 August 1978 in Płock) is a Polish footballer who plays for Zawisza Bydgoszcz.

References

1978 births
Living people
GKS Bełchatów players
Zawisza Bydgoszcz players
Ekstraklasa players
Polish footballers
Sportspeople from Płock
Association football defenders